Austrjapyx is a genus of diplurans in the family Japygidae.

Species
 Austrjapyx aberrans Silvestri, 1948
 Austrjapyx autuorii Silvestri, 1948
 Austrjapyx barberoi Silvestri, 1948
 Austrjapyx bitancourtii Silvestri, 1948
 Austrjapyx chapecoi Smith & González, 1964
 Austrjapyx degradans Silvestri, 1948
 Austrjapyx descolei Silvestri, 1948
 Austrjapyx lilloi Silvestri, 1948
 Austrjapyx neotropicalis (Silvestri, 1902)
 Austrjapyx parvulus Silvestri, 1948
 Austrjapyx peluffoi Silvestri, 1948
 Austrjapyx rochalimai Silvestri, 1948
 Austrjapyx teutonius Smith & González, 1964
 Austrjapyx travassosi Silvestri, 1948

References

Diplura